Cladotaenia is a genus of flatworms belonging to the family Taeniidae.

The genus has almost cosmopolitan distribution.

Species:

Cladotaenia accipitris 
Cladotaenia circi 
Cladotaenia cylindracea 
Cladotaenia feuta 
Cladotaenia foxi 
Cladotaenia globifera 
Cladotaenia micracantha 
Cladotaenia spasskii 
Cladotaenia vulturi

References

Platyhelminthes